Thông Biện (通辯) born Trí Không (d.1134) was a Vietnamese Buddhist historian and zen master whose recorded statements are the earliest written source for the history of Buddhism in Vietnam. He was a student of Viên Chiếu (圓照). He is mentioned in Lives of Eminent Zen Monks (vi) (禪苑集英, 1337):

The four monks mentioned are Mo Luo Qi Yu (Ma Ha Kỳ Vực) Kang Senghui (Khương Tăng Hội), Zhi Jiang Liang (Chi Cương Lương), and Mou Bo (Mâu Bác, i.e. :vi:Mâu Tử) author of the Mouzi Lihuolun (Lý Hoặc Luận).

The Queen Mother Ỷ Lan consulted the monk Thông Biện regarding the history of Buddhism in Vietnam in 1096 prior to her commencement of the plan to build 100 pagodas.

See also
 Buddhism in Vietnam

References

1134 deaths
Vietnamese Zen Buddhists
Zen Buddhism writers
Year of birth unknown
Lý dynasty Buddhist monks